Ralston Valley High School (RVHS or RV) is a comprehensive, four-year public high school in Arvada, a northwest suburb of Denver, Colorado. Opened for the 2000 school year, its enrollment is around 1800 students.

Ralston Valley High School is an eight-time recipient of an "Excellent" rating by the Colorado Department of Education.

History

The 24th public high school built in Jefferson County, Ralston Valley's opening relieved Arvada West High School, which was serving so many students in 1999 it was on a split schedule. Groundbreaking occurred in March 1999, and the school opened in the fall of 2000. With the exception of a few years when the award program was discontinued, RVHS has received the Colorado Department of Education's John Irwin School of Excellence Award yearly since 2005.

The mascot of Ralston Valley is the mustang. It was selected based on votes from local elementary and middle school students in Jefferson County, as well as Arvada West HS students who would be attending RVHS. The mascot is significant to the location of the school, which is located on land that was formerly a ranch that raised and bred horses. Part of this ranch still exists across the street from the southern edge of campus.

Curriculum

College preparation is the focus in all RVHS classes. RVHS offers an honors strand of courses for freshmen and sophomores and Advanced Placement courses. Students may opt to pursue an Honors Diploma.

Campus

The school building, situated on a  site in northwest Arvada, was designed by LKA Partners and won a Merit Award in 2002 from the Colorado chapter of the American Institute of Architects.

In March 2007, the school finished additional construction for expansion. This renovation closed off the lower level in a full square to connect the science, math and (new) foreign language halls. Previously, the science and math halls were only connected in a horseshoe shape. The Ralston Valley High School addition and remodel includes 170,000 square feet of new construction and 42,000 square feet of remodeling. The project entailed demolition of the existing academic and administration areas and the redevelopment of the site. The new facility has 44 general classrooms, 12 science classrooms, library, media area, auxiliary gym, administration area, kitchen and commons. The remodeling included locker rooms and art department. The 28.5-acre site offers soccer, softball and multi-use fields.

Further renovations included the addition of  resulting in an auxiliary gym with a bleacher mezzanine, weight room and expanded athletic locker rooms. RVHS has the Millikan oil-drop experiment equipment along with the equipment for finding the mass of an electron.

Additional improvements:
 Darkroom
 Orchestra pit in the auditorium
 Computer lab
 Expanded student commons
 New athletic practice field
 Publications lab
 Expanded parking

Construction began in December 2005, was completed in September 2007, and cost $29.5 million.

Beginning in 2022, renovations are being made to expand the school in the front and back. A new library will be built in the front of the school, which will allow for extra classrooms to be built where the current library is. Additionally, 4 new classrooms will be added in the C hall at the back of the school upstairs. Construction is expected to be finished for the 2023–24 school year.

Principals
Jon Donaldson (2000–2004)
Jim Ellis (2004–2014)
Gavan Goodrich (2014–2018)
Mica Buenning (2018–)

Extracurricular activities and classes

School publications

 The Review magazine (2013–): The Review is the student publication of Ralston Valley High School. It is published quarterly and features sports photography and school news.
The Stampede yearbook (2000–): yearly published student produced yearbook
Former student newspaper: The Ralston Valley [e]Xpress (2000–2013)

Athletics

Ralston Valley has won nine state championship titles in softball, boys' basketball, baseball, swimming & diving, coed cheerleading, and poms. The Mustangs have won 74 Jeffco league championships in 13 different sports. The school has received the Steinmark Award competing in the Jeffco league. The Steinmark is awarded to the school with the top overall athletic performance in the league. Ralston Valley seniors have received athletic scholarships at Division I and II NCAA schools, along with nearly every US service academy.

Ralston Valley fields teams in baseball, basketball, cheerleading, cross county, football. golf, ice hockey, girls' lacrosse, poms, soccer, softball, swimming, tennis, track and field, volleyball, and wrestling in interscholastic competition.

Ralston Valley initially competed in Class 4A Athletics in every sport except football. Football initially competed in 3A in its first two seasons, before moving up a classification to 4A. The school has since moved to Class 5A (the highest level in Colorado) as of fall 2009 in all athletics.

State championships won by the school include:
Boys' basketball: 2003 (4A)
Coed cheerleading: 2003 (4A), 2006 (4A/5A)
Poms: 2004 (4A)
Baseball: 2008 (4A)
Softball: 2002, 2008 (4A)
Girls' swimming: 2007, 2008, 2009 (5A)
Boys' golf: 2008 (5A)
Hockey: 2013, 2014 (5A); 2014: undefeated season, 23-0

The basketball court is named in honor of Lisa Nelson (coach and teacher) and the gym is named in gratitude after Jim Hynes (former athletic director and assistant principal).

Notable alumni

 Mariah Bell (2014) - figure skater, national champion at 2022 U.S. Championships
 Nick Fazekas (2003) - University of Nevada, Reno basketball player; drafted 34th by Dallas Mavericks
 Jordan Holloway (2014) - Baseball pitcher for the Miami Marlins
 Dan Skipper (2013) - American football offensive tackle for the University of Arkansas and the Detroit Lions of the National Football League (NFL)
 Dave Welsh (2003) - electric guitar player for pop band The Fray
 Andrew Wingard (2015) - American football safety for the University of Wyoming and the Jacksonville Jaguars of the National Football League (NFL)
 Ben Wysocki (2003) - drummer for pop band The Fray

References

External links
 

Educational institutions established in 2000
Public high schools in Colorado
Jefferson County Public Schools (Colorado)
Buildings and structures in Arvada, Colorado
Schools in Jefferson County, Colorado
2000 establishments in Colorado